Danko is a surname. Literally it is a diminutive of Daniel in some Slavic languages. Notable people with this surname include:
 
Andrej Danko (born 1974), Slovak lawyer and politician, Speaker of the National Council of the Slovak Republic
Betty Danko (1903–1979), Hollywood stuntwoman and stunt double
Danny Danko, American writer and photographer
Gary Danko, American chef
Harold Danko (born 1947), American jazz pianist
James Danko, American academic administrator
Rick Danko (1942–1999), Canadian musician, singer and songwriter, member of The Band
Stanislav Danko (born 1994), Slovak footballer
Taras Danko (born 1980), Ukrainian wrestler
Terry Danko (born 1949), Canadian musician and songwriter

Fictional 
Emile Danko, character on the television series Heroes
Ivan Danko, fictional Soviet officer in the film Red Heat